Derek Alexander Gerhard Fildebrandt (born October 18, 1985) is a Canadian politician and media executive. He is the publisher, president and chief executive officer of the Western Standard New Media Corp. He is a former member of the Legislative Assembly of Alberta. He is currently a member of the Wildrose Independence Party of Alberta, an Alberta separatist party.

Canadian Taxpayers Federation
After working in Ottawa as a National Research Director, Fildebrandt moved to Alberta in 2012 when he was promoted to the post of Alberta Director.

In February 2014, Fildebrandt released the CTF's balanced budget plan calling for $2.4 billion in spending cuts to business subsidies and the bureaucracy. In May 2014 he spoke out about buyout payments to political appointees. He was a conservative critic of former PC Premier Jim Prentice, calling him a "tax and spend liberal." During the Alberta PC leadership race, he filed Freedom of Information requests for Jim Prentice's federal expense records, releasing them in September 2014 which came after controversy about alleged irregularities in the destruction of the records.

Fildebrandt was credited by the Calgary Sun with playing a significant role in the downfall of former Alberta Premier Alison Redford and former Alberta Finance Minister Doug Horner. His term as Alberta Director of the CTF ended in November 2014.

Political career
On January 26, 2015, Fildebrandt announced that he would seek the Wildrose Party nomination in Strathmore-Brooks. He was named as the candidate on February 6, 2015. In response to PC challenges to the Wildrose's budget plan, Fildebrandt challenged Finance Minister Robin Campbell to a debate, which Campbell refused. On May 5, 2015, he was elected as the MLA for Strathmore-Brooks.

On May 11, 2015, Fildebrandt was appointed Shadow Finance Minister in the Wildrose Official Opposition Cabinet by Brian Jean. He has advocated for healthcare and seniors care infrastructure in his constituency. Fildebrandt has criticized the NDP for tax increases, deficit spending and its relationship with public sector unions.

He made several public statements throughout 2016, but most notoriously on December 14, 2016, when he broke ranks with Brian Jean and openly called for a merger of the Wildrose and PC Parties. One month later, Jean released a statement in favour of uniting the parties on the same day that Fildebrandt held a fundraiser at the Calgary Petroleum Club calling for a single united party.

Federal politics
Fildebrandt supported Maxime Bernier for the Conservative Party of Canada leadership in 2017. Filderbrandt explained that he left the federal Conservative party after the 2009 auto bailout and Bernier's leadership run drew him back into the party.

United Conservative Party
On May 18, 2017, Brian Jean and Jason Kenney signed an agreement in principle to create the United Conservative Party (UCP) of Alberta. Fildebrandt publicly mused about running in the UCP leadership election, but decided against it, announcing he would instead endorse a candidate other than Brian Jean.

In 2017, Fildebrandt launched his PAC called United Liberty which is based on libertarian policies such as lower taxes, and less government control.

In August 2017, Fildebrandt left the UCP caucus after a series of incidents to sit as an independent (see #Controversies).

During the UCP leadership election, Jason Kenney implied that Mr. Fildebrandt could be welcomed back to the UCP caucus so long as his legal battles were eventually sorted out stating, "I don't see us dealing with any prospective admission … until all of that's been dealt with."

In February 2018 the leader of the UCP Jason Kenney announced that Fildebrandt was not welcome in the UCP Caucus. Kenney commented: "I can only conclude that Mr. Fildebrandt deliberately misled us in refusing to disclose this outstanding charge." Fildebrandt continued in his electoral riding as an independent. Fildebrandt claimed that he was given an ultimatum by Kenney who wanted to run female MLA Leela Aheer in the new combined riding of Chestermere-Strathmore. Fildebrandt said he was told by Mr. Kenney that "if I wanted to return... I couldn't run in my own constituency."

Freedom Conservative Party of Alberta
On July 20, 2018, Derek Fildebrandt formed the Freedom Conservative Party of Alberta. "We in the FCP are conservatives, libertarians and Alberta patriots," said Fildebrandt. In his speech Fildebrandt stated that the party was a true grassroots party that would not adhere to backroom political games. Fildebrandt won the leadership for the party on October 20, 2018.

His bid to remain in the Alberta Legislative Assembly failed, as he was defeated by Leela Aheer whilst running in Chestermere-Strathmore in the 2019 Alberta general election, garnering less than 10% of the vote.

On April 30, 2019, after failing to win any seats in the legislature, Fildebrandt announced his resignation as Freedom Conservative Party Leader.

After his loss, Fildebrandt told the media he was returning to private life to “get a real job, make some money. Honestly, I’m happy to be done with politics. I’m happy to have my family back, to have a sense of private life back.”

Western Standard

On October 23, 2019 Fildebrandt bought and relaunched the Western Standard online newspaper, a right wing publication that had ceased operations in 2007.

In May of 2022, Fildebrandt announced that Western Standard New Media Corp. had acquired the Alberta Report and was relaunching it.

Controversies 
On May 27, 2016, Wildrose leader Brian Jean suspended Fildebrandt for an indefinite period of time after he wrote "Proud to have constituents like you!" in response to a comment referring to Ontario premier Kathleen Wynne as "Mr. Wynne, or whatever the hell she identifies as" which Jean called "unacceptable." This came on the heels of an incident where Fildebrandt criticised Premier Wynne in the Alberta Legislature as Wynne sat in the gallery as a guest. Fildebrandt said he "entirely misread" the original comment. On Tuesday, May 31, he was reinstated into the Wildrose Caucus and as the Opposition Shadow Minister of Finance.

Also in 2016, Fildebrandt was accused of hitting his neighbour's parked vehicle with his truck, causing an estimated $2000 in damage. He appeared in court to plea not guilty and denied it happened, saying "I would've left a note on the front windshield. It's the decent thing to do." On December 4, 2017, Fildebrandt was found guilty leaving the scene and failing to notify the owner of a damaged vehicle.

On August 9, 2017, it was reported that Fildebrandt was renting out his Edmonton apartment on Airbnb while claiming a housing allowance from the Legislature of Alberta to pay for the apartment. He initially defended himself, calling the act "reasonable and a part of the modern sharing economy." Later, Fildebrandt apologized and claimed that he returned the income made from the property.

On August 14, 2017 Alberta Party leader Greg Clark revealed that Fildebrandt had been charging meals to his MLA expense account while simultaneously claiming his MLA per-diem for meals. The potential total of which was $192.60 over a period of two years and Fildebrandt stated that it was a result of administrative errors. Clark claimed that Fildebrandt was effectively "double-claiming" his meals, a practice Clark claimed was in violation of the Legislative Member Service Committee Order. Fildebrandt responded to the claims by saying "I should have been more careful in reviewing them before signing off. I will fully reimburse any discrepancy and take immediate action to ensure that errors like this do not happen again."

On December 13, 2017, Fildebrandt was charged with trespassing onto private property and hunting a white-tailed deer in violation of the Wildlife Act. Fildebrandt apologized, claiming that he didn't know he was on private property and that he donated the deer to a food bank.

Electoral history

2019 general election

2015 general election

Notes

References

External links 
 

Living people
Canadian political commentators
Wildrose Party MLAs
1985 births
21st-century Canadian politicians
Freedom Conservative Party MLAs
Independent Alberta MLAs
United Conservative Party MLAs